Tyler Aldridge (born September 2, 1984) is an American professional golfer.

Aldridge was born in Caldwell, Idaho and played college golf at Boise State University.

Aldridge turned professional in 2004 and played on mini-tours before starting on the Nationwide Tour (now Web.com Tour) in 2008. He earned his 2009 PGA Tour card at Qualifying School in 2008 and split the 2009 season between the PGA Tour (three cuts made in 17 starts) and the Nationwide Tour (five cuts in 11 events). He played on PGA Tour Canada from 2012 to 2014 with a best finish of tied for second at the 2013 Times Colonist Island Savings Open. 

He was back on the Web.com Tour in 2015, after coming through Qualifying School with one stroke to spare, and won the inaugural Greater Dallas Open in June.

Professional wins (2)

Web.com Tour wins (1)

Other wins (1)
2006 Idaho Open

See also
2008 PGA Tour Qualifying School graduates
2015 Web.com Tour Finals graduates

References

External links

American male golfers
Boise State Broncos men's golfers
PGA Tour golfers
Korn Ferry Tour graduates
Golfers from Idaho
People from Caldwell, Idaho
1984 births
Living people